Mohamed Hossam Beso (born 1 January 2001) is an Egyptian professional footballer who plays as a midfielder for Zamalek.

Career statistics

Club

Notes

References

2001 births
Living people
Egyptian footballers
Association football midfielders
Zamalek SC players
Egyptian Premier League players